Róisín Marie Murphy (born 5 July 1973) is an Irish singer, songwriter, and record producer. She first became known in the 1990s as one half of the pop duo Moloko alongside English musician Mark Brydon. After the breakup of Moloko, she embarked on a solo career and released her debut solo album Ruby Blue (written and produced with experimental musician Matthew Herbert) to critical praise in 2005. Her second solo album, Overpowered, was released in 2007.

After an eight-year hiatuswhich was sporadically interrupted by non-album singles, side projects, and guest appearances on other artists' recordsMurphy released her third solo album Hairless Toys in 2015; it was nominated for the Mercury Music Prize and Ireland's Choice Music Prize. The following year, she released her fourth album Take Her Up to Monto. In 2018, she released four 12" releases in collaboration with producer Maurice Fulton. In 2020, Murphy released her disco-inspired fifth solo album, Róisín Machine. It received critical acclaim and became her most commercially successful album.

Early life
Róisín Marie Murphy was born in Arklow on 5 July 1973. When she was 12 years old, she and her family moved to England, where they settled in Manchester. She embraced 1960s fashion from going with her mother, who was an antiques dealer, to car boot sales and charity shops. After three years of living in Manchester, her parents divorced and both of them moved back to Ireland. 15-year-old Murphy, however, insisted on remaining alone in England because she did not think that her mother had the strength to continue taking care of her. She lived with her best friend for a year, until she could receive Housing Benefit and move into a nearby apartment.

Murphy's school years were difficult as she recalled in 2019: "I never felt it was like being bullied; I always felt I intimidated people, and that was why I got in trouble." She befriended a group of "weird boys who wore black" and who listened to The Jesus and Mary Chain. When Murphy attended a Sonic Youth concert with a friend, she was inspired to become a performer. She concealed her singing voice, not wanting other people to know she "sounded like Elaine Paige". She later joined a post-punk band that split after a handful of performances. She enrolled in a sixth form college at the age of 17 and later considered going to art school. At the age of 19, she moved to Sheffield, where she began going to nightclubs and was inspired by the Vivienne Westwood designs she saw at Trash.

Career

1994–2003: Moloko
Murphy met Mark Brydon in 1994 at a party, using the chat-up line "Do you like my tight sweater?  See how it fits my body." Brydon brought Murphy to his Fon Studios, where he auditioned her voice on tape, and liked Murphy's theatrical delivery.  They began dating, and the newly formed Moloko were signed to Echo Records, releasing their debut album Do You Like My Tight Sweater? the following year. The album was described by Heather Phares of AllMusic as combining elements of trip hop and funk with electronic dance music, using a more humorous approach than some of their contemporaries. The follow-up I Am Not a Doctor covered similar musical ground, and a remix by Boris Dlugosch of "Sing It Back" enjoyed international success, and would go on to be featured on more than 110 compilation albums. In place of paying Dlugosch, Murphy helped write "Never Enough", which reached number sixteen on the UK Singles Chart in June 2001.

October 2000 saw the release of Moloko's third album Things to Make and Do, for which they employed more live instrumentation, and more multifaceted arrangements by keyboardist Eddie Stevens. The album reached number three on the UK Albums Chart, and "The Time Is Now" became their most successful British single, reaching number two. Murphy and Brydon broke up but were contractually obligated to deliver further albums.  After the 2003 release of Statues, Brydon backed out of much of the album's promotion, so Murphy handled most of it herself.

Although no official statement was issued pertaining to Moloko's future, Murphy told Q magazine in May 2005, "We left it on good terms after a very successful tour. We shook hands, said "see you later", and haven't spoken since. I don't know what Mark thinks of this record or what he's doing. I don't know if we will or we won't reunite. Myself, I don't not want to."

2004–2005: Ruby Blue

Murphy began doing solo work while still in Moloko, which included her contributions to the works of other artists including Handsome Boy Modeling School and Boris Dlugosch, for whom she sang on the track "Never Enough", which became a huge club hit, hitting the top three of the US Hot Dance Club Play chart.

Murphy recorded her first official solo material in 2004 with producer Matthew Herbert, who had previously done remixes for Moloko. She had wanted to work with him again, commenting that "it felt very natural... because Matthew makes things seem quicker and easier." After the pair had recorded a few songs, Murphy found that she enjoyed working with Herbert, and her label Echo Records let her work freely without any deadline. When she presented them the album, they found it odd and did not hear any songs that would make successful singles. The A&R division suggested that Murphy make some changes to make it more radio-friendly. Murphy refused, stating that she "wanted it to be as pure as possible." The label later came to support her.

Murphy released her debut album Ruby Blue in June 2005. Prior to this, tracks from the album were made available on three limited edition, vinyl-only releases: Sequins #1, Sequins #2 and Sequins #3. The release of the EP's was to precede a London exhibition by artist Simon Henwood, featuring paintings of Murphy in various sequined outfits (some of Henwood's paintings are used as cover images for the record jackets). The titling is also a pun on "sequins" and the related word "sequence". Henwood also directed the two video clips for the album's singles ("If We're in Love" and "Sow into You").

Ruby Blue samples sounds made by everyday objects and actions, including cosmetics, brass mice, dancing and ornaments. It mixes the electronic music for which Moloko was known with jazz and pop styles. Although the album was a commercial failure, it drew mainly positive reviews; Pitchfork Media called it "perfect, the ultimate combination of human warmth and technological know-how."

2006–2008: Overpowered

In May 2006, Murphy signed with EMI. Her first single for the label, "Overpowered", was released on 2 July 2007. Written by Murphy and Paul Dolby (Seiji) of Bugz in the Attic and mixed by Tom Elmhirst, the single was accompanied by a series of remixes from Seamus Haji, Kris Menace, Hervé and Loose Cannons. A second single "Let Me Know" (a collaboration with Andy Cato), was released in September and the album, named Overpowered, was released soon after.

In September 2007, Murphy received a pre-nomination for the MTV Europe Music Award for Best Inter Act, but did not make it to the final list. She performed "Let Me Know" on Friday Night with Jonathan Ross on 5 October 2007.

Murphy sustained an eye injury on 27 October 2007, while on tour in Russia to promote Overpowered. She was forced to cancel several subsequent dates on the tour.

2009–2014: Hiatus
Despite well-known troubles at EMI, Murphy started working again with Sejii on a third studio solo album. In 2008 she recorded a cover of the Bryan Ferry song "Slave to Love" that featured in a campaign for Gucci, and released on the promo-only "Movie Star" single. Murphy previewed material at the SEone club in London in 2009, performing "Momma's Place" and "Hold up Your Hands", and premiered the single "Orally Fixated" on her Myspace page in November 2009. The song was released later in the month. with The Guardian offering a free download of the song for 48 hours.

From 2010 until early 2013 Murphy's only releases were on other artists' recordings. She contributed vocals to Crookers's album Tons of Friends, David Byrne and Fatboy Slim's project Here Lies Love, Mason's "Boadicea", Tony Christie's "7 Hills", The Feeling's "Dance for the Lights", an anonymous producer's "Simulation", "Golden Era" by David Morales, "Flash of Light" and "Invisions" with Luca C & Brigante, "Look Around You" by Boris Dlugosch, "Alternate State" by Hot Natured, Freeform Five's "Leviathan", and "In My Garden" with Invisible Cities. The exception to this was a 12", "Simulation", released under her own name in 2012.

2014–2017: Mi Senti, Hairless Toys, Take Her Up to Monto

In May 2014, Murphy released a six-track Italian language EP Mi Senti, featuring a new composition and previous Italian pop hits. Her third studio album Hairless Toys followed a year later, to positive reviews. 

Her July 2016 album Take Her Up to Monto was recorded during the same sessions as Hairless Toys, and included long-time collaborator and producer Eddie Stevens. The Monto title is derived from an Irish folk song of the same name, popularised by The Dubliners in the 1960s, which Murphy's father sang to her as a child. The release was followed by a number of European festival dates and a number of North American shows.

2018–2022: Fulton collaboration, Róisín Machine 

Through 2018 The Vinyl Factory released a series of four 12-inch discs produced by Baltimore house music pioneer Maurice Fulton. Consisting of eight original songs, each around 6 minutes, Murphy directed music videos for the four A-side releases.

The single "Murphy's Law" was released 4 March 2020.  During the subsequent pandemic quarantine, her home performances for a livestream concert were released as a series of six short films.

Her fifth solo album Róisín Machine was released 2 October 2020. It includes ten tracks, with singles "Simulation" and "Jealousy" released several years prior, together with more recently produced songs "Incapable", "Narcissus", "Murphy's Law", and "Something More".

Murphy portrayed the blood witch Mercury in the 2022 Netflix series The Bastard Son & The Devil Himself.

2023–present: Ninja Tune Signing, New Single `CooCool´ 
In March 2023 Murphy has announced her signing to Ninja Tune with a new single, 'CooCool', which was produced by DJ Koze.
Murphy collaborated with artist Beth Frey and photographer Connor Egan on her latest single cover 'CooCool'.

Style

Electronic Beats described Murphy as "this adolescent century's true art-pop queen," writing that "her sensuous and ominous output is scattered across various genres and moods." AllMusic described her as "a purveyor of adventurous, omnivorous pop that blended influences as far-flung as disco and hot jazz." Australian publication OutInPerth called her "Ireland's queen of the avant-garde." Drowned in Sound'''s Giuseppe Zevolli wrote that "she's merged pop, house, and disco with an avant-garde sensibility and a stunning, shape-shifting visual output that never ceases to provoke." Critic Mark Fisher located her music in a glam lineage that includes Roxy Music, Grace Jones, and the New Romantics, noting Murphy's attention to the cultivation of artifice and persona.

The sound of Moloko's early work drew on electronic and trip hop influences before transitioning to a more organic sound. According to  Elizabeth Vincentelli of The New York Times, "it was only after [Moloko's] breakup that Murphy truly refined her trademark fusion of glossy sheen and playful experimentation." Her diverse solo work has included collaborations with experimental jazz composer Matthew Herbert and electronic producer Eddie Stevens, drawing variously on house music, ballroom culture, and avant-garde electronica. Murphy has a contralto vocal range, which has been described as distinctive, smoky and jazzy. Heather Phares described it as "combin[ining] a wild variety of voices and textures, from impassively chilly to gorgeously lilting to gleefully offbeat." The first performers that left an impression on her were Kim Gordon from Sonic Youth and Kim Deal from the Pixies. Iggy Pop also inspired her for his "energy - and he's a giver". She stated that her biggest influences were Siouxsie Sioux, Grace Jones and Björk. She was also inspired by Italian female singers such as Mina and Patty Pravo for the way they owned the stage when they moved. She described her performances as "a bit like The Rocky Horror Picture Show" and her audiences were said to "dress up to mirror Murphy’s own spectacular fashions."

Murphy has drawn considerable attention and praise for her eccentric and imaginative fashion style. Electronic Beats noted "her reputation for sporting avant-garde couture into a place among fashion's elite."  According to Jad Salfiti of The Financial Times, "[her] clothes amplify her personality: exhibitionist, playful, eclectic, larger than life.

 Personal life 
Murphy lives in Ibiza, having previously split her time between London and Ireland. She previously dated British artist Simon Henwood; their daughter, Clodagh, was born on 15 December 2009. She has sole custody of Clodagh. Murphy is currently in a relationship with Italian producer Sebastiano Properzi. Their son, Tadhg, was born in September 2012.

Discography

 Ruby Blue (2005)
 Overpowered (2007)
 Hairless Toys (2015)
 Take Her Up to Monto (2016)
 Róisín Machine (2020)

Awards and nominations
{| class=wikitable
|-
! Year !! Awards !! Work !! Category !! Result !! Ref. 
|-
| 1999
| rowspan=1|Ivor Novello Awards
| rowspan=3|"Sing It Back"
| rowspan=1|The Ivors Dance Award
| 
| 
|-
| rowspan=4|2000
| Brit Awards
| British Single of the Year
| 
|
|-
| ASCAP Pop Music Awards
| Club Award
| 
| 
|-
| MTV Europe Music Awards
| Moloko
| Best Dance
| 
|
|-
| Q Awards
| rowspan=4|"The Time is Now"
| Best Single
| 
|
|-
| rowspan=5|2001
| rowspan=1|Ivor Novello Awards
| rowspan=1|The Ivors Dance Award
| 
| 
|-
| rowspan=4|Brit Awards
| British Single of the Year
| 
| rowspan=4|
|-
| British Video of the Year
| 
|-
| rowspan=2|Moloko
| British Group
| 
|-
| British Dance Act
| 
|-
| rowspan=7|2003
| rowspan=3|TMF Awards
| Statues| Best International Album
| 
| rowspan=3|
|-
| rowspan=4|Moloko
| Best International Dance
| 
|-
| Best International Live
| 
|-
| rowspan=4|Žebřík Music Awards
| Best International Group
| 
| rowspan=4|
|-
| Best International Surprise
| 
|-
| Herself
| Best International Female
| 
|-
| Statues| Best International Album
| 
|-
| rowspan=3|2004
| rowspan=1|Ivor Novello Awards
| "Familiar Feeling"
| rowspan=1|The Ivors Dance Award
| 
| 
|-
| rowspan=1|Meteor Music Awards
| rowspan=1|Herself
| rowspan=1|Best Irish Female
| 
|
|-
| Edison Awards
| rowspan=1|Statues| Best Dance
| 
|
|-
| rowspan=3|2005
| Antville Music Video Awards
| "Sow into You"
| Worst Video
| 
|
|-
| rowspan=2|Žebřík Music Awards
| rowspan=3|Herself
| Best International Female
| 
| rowspan=2|
|-
| Best International Surprise
| 
|-
| 2006
| rowspan=1|Meteor Music Awards
| rowspan=1|Best Irish Female
| 
| 
|-
| rowspan=3|2007
| Popjustice £20 Music Prize
| "Overpowered"
| Best British Pop Single
| 
| 
|-
| Žebřík Music Awards
| rowspan=3|Overpowered| Best International Album
| 
| 
|-
| Choice Music Prize
| Album of the Year
| 
|
|-
| rowspan=4|2008
| Hungarian Music Awards
| Best Foreign Dance Album
| 
|
|-
| rowspan=2|Meteor Music Awards
| rowspan=2|Herself
| Best Irish Female
|
| rowspan=2|
|-
| Best Irish Pop Act
| 
|-
| rowspan=2|UK Music Video Awards
| "You Know Me Better"
| rowspan=2|Best Styling in a Video
| 
| 
|-
|rowspan=3|2015
| "Evil Eyes"
| 
| 
|-
| Mercury Prize
| rowspan=2|Hairless Toys| rowspan=2|Album of the Year
| 
|
|-
| Choice Music Prize
| 
|
|-
| rowspan=2|2016
| International Dance Music Awards
| "Evil Eyes" 
| Best Indie Dance Track
| 
|
|-
| AIM Independent Music Awards
| Herself
| Outstanding Contribution to Music 
| 
|
|-
| 2019
| Q Awards
| "Incapable"
| Best Track 
| 
|
|-
| rowspan=3|2020
| Choice Music Prize
| Róisín Machine''
| Album of the Year 
| 
|
|-
| rowspan=2|Rober Awards Music Prize
| Herself
| Best Electronic Artist
| 
| rowspan=2|
|-
| "Jealousy"
| Floorfiller of the Year
|

References

External links

 – official site
 – official site

1973 births
Contraltos
Irish dance musicians
Irish electronic musicians
Irish pop singers
Irish women singer-songwriters
Living people
Moloko
Musicians from County Wicklow
People from Arklow
Synth-pop singers
Women in electronic music
Art pop musicians
Experimental pop musicians
Avant-pop musicians
20th-century Irish women singers
21st-century Irish women singers
Irish women record producers
Irish expatriates in England
Dance-pop musicians